Dacentrurus (meaning "tail full of points"), originally known as Omosaurus, is a genus of stegosaurian dinosaur from the Late Jurassic to Early Cretaceous (154 - 140 mya) of Europe. Its type species, Omosaurus armatus, was named in 1875, based on a skeleton found in a clay pit in the Kimmeridge Clay in Swindon, England. In 1902 the genus was renamed Dacentrurus because the name Omosaurus had already been used for a crocodylian. After 1875, half a dozen other species would be named but perhaps only Dacentrurus armatus is valid. Finds of this animal have been limited and much of its appearance is uncertain.

Discovery and species 
 
On 23 May 1874, James Shopland of the Swindon Brick and Tyle Company reported to Professor Richard Owen that their clay pit, the Swindon Great Quarry below Old Swindon Hill at Swindon in Wiltshire, had again produced a fossil skeleton. Owen sent out William Davies to secure the specimen, which proved to be encased in an eight feet high clay nodule. During an attempt to lift it in its entirety, the loam clump crumbled into several pieces. These were eventually transported to London in crates with a total weight of three tonnes. The bones were subsequently partially uncovered by Owen's preparator, the mason Caleb Barlow.

Owen named and described the remains in 1875 as the type species Omosaurus armatus. The generic name is derived from Greek ὦμος, omos, "upper arm", in reference to the robust humerus. The specific name armatus can mean "armed" in Latin and in this case refers to a large spike that Owen assumed was present on the upper arm.

The holotype, BMNH 46013, was found in a layer of the Kimmeridge Clay Formation dating from the late Kimmeridgian. The main nodule fragment contains the pelvis; a series of six posterior dorsal vertebrae, all sacrals and eight anterior caudal vertebrae; a right femur and some loose vertebrae. In all, thirteen detached vertebrae are present in the material. Also an almost complete left forelimb was contained by another loam clump. Additional elements include a partial fibula with calcaneum, a partial tibia, a right neck plate and a left tail spike.

 
Several other species would be named within the genus Omosaurus. Part of the British Museum of Natural History collection was specimen BMNH 46321, a pair of spike bases found in the Kimmeridge Clay by William Cunnington near the Great Western Railway cutting near Wootton Bassett. These Owen in 1877 named Omosaurus hastiger, the epithet meaning "spike-bearer" or "lance-wielder", the spikes by him seen as placed on the wrist of the animal. In 1887, John Whitaker Hulke named Omosaurus durobrivensis based on specimen BMNH R1989 found at Tanholt, close to Eye, Cambridgeshire, the specific name being derived from Durobrivae. (That specimen is sometimes mistakenly said to have been found at Fletton, Peterborough, Cambridgeshire, which is where Alfred Nicholson Leeds made most of his finds.) This in 1956 became the separate genus Lexovisaurus. In 1893, Harry Govier Seeley named Omosaurus phillipsii, based on a femur, specimen YM 498, the epithet honouring the late John Phillips. Seeley suggested this may be the same taxon as Priodontognathus phillipsii Seeley 1869, which has led to the misunderstanding, due to its having the same specific name, that Priodontognathus was simply subsumed by him under Omosaurus. This interpretation however, is incorrect as both species have different holotypes. "Omosaurus leedsi" is a nomen nudum used by Seeley on a label for CAMSM J.46874, a plate found in Cambridgeshire, the epithet honouring Alfred Nicholson Leeds. In 1910 Friedrich von Huene named Omosaurus vetustus, based on specimen OUM J.14000, a femur found in the west bank of Cherwell River, the epithet meaning "the ancient one". In 1911 Franz Nopcsa named Omosaurus lennieri, the epithet honouring Gustave Lennier, based on a partial skeleton in 1899 found in the Kimmeridgian Argiles d'Octeville near  in Normandy, France. The specimen would be destroyed during the allied bombing of Caen in 1944.

 
Even as the last two Omosaurus species were named, it had become known that the name Omosaurus had been preoccupied by a "crocodilian" (in fact a phytosaur), Omosaurus perplexus Leidy 1856. In 1902 Frederick Augustus Lucas renamed the genus into Dacentrurus. The name is derived from Greek δα~, da~, "very" or "full of", κέντρον, kentron, "point", and οὐρά, oura, "tail". Lucas only gave a new combination name for the type species Omosaurus armatus: Dacentrurus armatus, but in 1915 Edwin Hennig moved most Omosaurus species to Dacentrurus, resulting in a Dacentrurus hastiger, Dacentrurus durobrivensis, Dacentrurus phillipsi and a Dacentrurus lennieri. Nevertheless, it would be common for researchers to use the name Omosaurus instead until the middle of the twentieth century. D. vetustus, earlier indicated as Omosaurus (Dacentrurus) vetustus by von Huene, was included with Lexovisaurus as a Lexovisaurus vetustus in 1983, but that assignment was rejected with both editions of the Dinosauria, and O. vetustus is now the type species of "Eoplophysis".

In 2021, remains attributed to Dacentrurus sensu lato were reported from the earliest Cretaceous (Berriasian) Angeac-Charente bonebed of France, these consisted of a partial skeleton including parts of the braincase, vertebrae, ribs and phalanges.

Distribution 
 
 
Due to the fact it represented the best known stegosaurian species from Europe, most stegosaur discoveries in this area were referred to Dacentrurus. This included finds in Wiltshire and Dorset in southern England (among them a vertebra ascribed to D. armatus in Weymouth), fossils from France and Spain and five more historically recent skeletons from Portugal. Most of these finds were fragmentary in nature; the only more complete skeletons were the holotypes of D. armatus and D. lennieri. Eventually the strata from which Dacentrurus was reported amounted to the following list:

 Argiles d'Octeville
 Camadas de Alcobaça
 Kimmeridge Clay
 Lourinhã Formation
 Unidade Bombarral
 Villar del Arzobispo Formation

 
Eggs attributed to Dacentrurus have been discovered in Portugal.

Peter Malcolm Galton in the eighties referred all stegosaur remains from Late Jurassic deposits in western Europe to D. armatus. A radically different approach was in 2008 taken by Susannah Maidment who limited the material of D. armatus to its holotype. Most named species, among them Astrodon pusillus from Portugal based on stegosaur fossils, she considered nomina dubia. She considered the specimens from mainland Europe possibly a separate species, but as it was too limited to establish distinctive traits she assigned it to Dacentrurus sp.

In 2013, Alberto Cobos and Francisco Gascó described stegosaurian vertebral remains, which were found grouped together in the "Barranco Conejero" locality of the Villar del Arzobispo Formation in Riodeva (Teruel, Spain).  The remains were assigned to Dacentrurus armatus and consist of four vertebral centra, specimens MAP-4488-4491, from a single individual, two of which are cervical vertebrae, the third is dorsal, and the last is caudal.  This discovery was considered significant because it would demonstrate both the intra-specific variability of Dacentrurus armatus, and the strong prevalence of Dacentrurus in the Iberian range during the Jurassic-Cretaceous boundary, approximately 145 million years ago. However, new paratype material of Miragaia described in 2019 shows stronger affinities to the Villar del Arzobispo material than the holotype material of Dacentrurus.

Description 

For a stegosaur, the gut was especially broad, and a massive rump is also indicated by exceptionally wide dorsal vertebrae centra. The hindlimb was rather short, but the forelimb relatively long, largely because of a long lower arm.

Although Dacentrurus is considered to have the same proportions as Stegosaurus, its plate and spike configuration is known to be rather different, as it probably had both two rows of small plates on its neck and two rows of longer spikes along its tail. The holotype specimen of Dacentrurus armatus contained a small blunt asymmetrical neck plate and also included a tail spike which could have been part of a thagomizer. The tail spike had sharp cutting edges on its front and rear side. Dacentrurus has sometimes been portrayed with a spike growing near the shoulder, similarly to a Kentrosaurus. Whether this portrayal is accurate or not is not yet determined.

Phylogeny 
 
 
 
Dacentrurus was the first stegosaur of which good remains had ever been discovered; earlier finds as Paranthodon, Regnosaurus and Craterosaurus were too limited to be directly recognisable as representing a distinctive new group. Owen therefore was unable to closely relate his Omosaurus to other species but was aware it represented a member of the Dinosauria. In 1888 Richard Lydekker named a family Omosauridae, but this name fell into disuse once it was realised that Omosaurus was preoccupied. In the twentieth century Dacentrurus was usually assigned to the Stegosauridae.

Earlier often considered to have been a rather basal stegosaurid, Dacentrurus was by more extensive cladistic analyses in 2008 and 2010 shown to be relatively derived, forming the clade Dacentrurinae with its sister species Miragaia longicollum. The Dacentrurinae were the sister group of Stegosaurus (Stegosaurinae sensu Sereno). The following cladogram shows the position of Dacentrurus armatus within the Thyreophora according to Maidment (2010):

See also 
 Timeline of stegosaur research

References

Further reading

External links 
 Natural History Museum site on Dacentrurus
 dulops.net on Dacentrurus 
 Discussion on the claimed small size of Dacentrurus

Stegosaurs
Kimmeridgian life
Late Jurassic dinosaurs of Europe
Jurassic Portugal
Jurassic Spain
Fossils of Spain
Fossil taxa described in 1902
Taxa named by Frederic Augustus Lucas
Ornithischian genera